The House of the Mosque is a Dutch-language novel by Iranian writer Kader Abdolah, published in 2005. 
The English language translation of The House of the Mosque was published in January 2010.

Plot
The book follows the life of an Iranian family from 1969 on through the regime of Shah Mohammad Reza Pahlavi, the Iranian revolution of 1979 and the installment of the Khomeini government, and ends after Khomeini's death. The story is a "semi-mythical narrative ... bearing a 'flying carpet' element of fantasy" that is countered by the horrifying events that the protagonists face as the revolution progresses. 

Most of the plot takes place in a large (36-room) house attached to the Friday mosque in Senejan, three hours by train from Qom, a fictionalized version of Senjan, now a district of Arak, Iran. Kader Abdolah was born and grew up in a similar house in that city. In the presentation of real historical events, many names and locations are altered, so that the novel does not pretend to be an accurate description of the historical situation. The main character is Aqa Jaan ("Dear Master", a title often given to the male head of a household in Iran). Shahbal, the son of his blind cousin who is the muezzin of the mosque, personifies the author (Shahbal is called the "narrator" of the story in the cast of characters). Like Shahbal, Kader Abdolah was active in leftist underground political movements in the time of the Shah and of Khomeini, and fled Iran in 1985 to settle in the Netherlands. Unlike Shahbal, the author did not kill anyone, but instead avenged the murders of his brother and sister with his pen. For example, before fleeing Iran, Shahbal killed Khalkhal, a fictionalized version of Khomeini's "hanging judge" Sadeq Khalkhali, but the real Khakhali died of old age in 2003.

Main themes
The House of the Mosque primarily explores the lifestyle of a traditional, extended Iranian family and how they coped with the changes brought by the Westernization of Iran until 1979, the revolution and the subsequent radicalization.  Additionally, the book portrays struggles between the leaders of the bazaar and the religious rule of the imams—and between family members who are traditionalists and those who are caught up in revolutionary ideas and do not follow the old rules of the house.

Main characters
Aqa Jaan - head of the bazaar and head of the family, works in the carpet business
Fakhri Sadat - wife of Aqa Jaan
Jawad, Nasrin and Ensi - son and daughters of Aqa Jaan and Fakhri Sadat
Alsaberi - the imam of the Senejan mosque; Aqa Jaan's cousin
Zinat -wife of Alsaberi, who radicalizes and becomes head of the morality police after the revolution
Ahmad - son of Alsaberi and Zinat, successor of his father as imam of the mosque
Sadiq - Alsaberi and Zinat's eldest daughter
Khalkhal - husband of Sadiq, also imam, a close ally of Ayatollah Khomeini, and the judge of Allah later in the book
Lizard - Sadiq and Khalkhal's deformed son
Aqa Shoja / Muezzin - the mosque's blind muezzin; potter by profession; Aqa Jaan and Alsaberi's cousin
Shahbal - son of Muezzin; spiritual son of Aqa Jaan 
Golebeh and Golbanu - the "grandmothers"  who run the house, where they have lived for over 40 years
Nosrat - Aqa Jaan's younger brother who left the house for city life
Kazem Khan - poet; uncle of Aqa Jaan

Awards
Grinzane Cavour Prize, 2009

See also
NRC's Best Dutch novels

References

External links
 presentation articleHet huis van de moskee in Dutch.
 BBC World Service program, 'The Strand,' 23 January 2010, describes the book and interviews the author
 BBC program, 'Saturday Review,' 23 January 2010, a panel of readers critique the book.
 Canongate's profile of Kader Abdolah 

2005 novels
Books about Islam and society
Dutch-language novels
Novels set in Iran
Novels set in the Iranian Revolution